Acacia scabra is a shrub of the genus Acacia and the subgenus Phyllodineae. It is native to Western Australia.

A. scabra is thought to be a variant of Acacia nodiflora that has slightly larger phyllodes.

See also
 List of Acacia species

References

scabra
Acacias of Western Australia
Taxa named by George Bentham
Plants described in 1855